Noch koroche dnya (lit. Night is Shorter Than Day), is the sixth studio album by Russian Heavy metal band Aria.

It is the first album to feature guitarist Sergey Terentyev, who replaced Sergey Mavrin. During the recording of Noch koroche dnya, the band was about to split up, as vocalist Valery Kipelov was going to leave the band alongside Mavrin to start a new project. Alexey Bulgakov was hired as a replacement vocalist and recorded several songs with Aria. Ultimately, Moroz Records persuaded Kipelov to return to the band and record his part. Versions of songs with Bulgakov on vocals were never officially released. Songs for the planned Kipelov and Mavrin project were released as the album Smutnoye Vremia in 1997.

Track listing

Personnel
Valery Kipelov - Vocals
Vladimir Holstinin - Guitar, Sound Engineer
Виталий Дубинин - Bass, Sound Engineer
Сергей Терентьев - Guitar
Александр Манякин - Drums
Aleksandr Myasnikov - Keyboard
Margarita Pushkina - Lyrics
Aria - Management
Andrey Subbotin - Mastering
Vasily Gavrilov - Artist
Nadir Chanishev - Photography
Pavel Semenov - Computer Design

References

1995 albums
Aria (band) albums